Jantzen Beach Amusement Park was a popular amusement park from 1928 to 1970 in Portland, Oregon, on Hayden Island in the middle of the Columbia River. "The Coney Island of the West" opened on May 26, 1928 as the largest amusement park in the nation, covering over 123 acres (50 ha) at the northern tip of Portland.

History
In 1927, William A. Logus and Leo F. Smith purchased  of land on Hayden Island from the Portland Electric Power Company. Logus and Smith headed the Hayden Island Amusement Company and they built an amusement resort and tourist park named Jantzen Beach Amusement Park for one of the park's investors, Carl Jantzen, of Jantzen swimsuit fame. The door opened to the public on May 26, 1928. It surpassed all attendance expectations; over 30 million people patronized the park through its 42 years.

On opening day, Saturday May 26, 1928, 15,000 people paid the $0.10 admission. The following day, 25,000 people came out to the park.

The C.W. Parker carousel, built in 1921, was moved to Jantzen Beach in 1927. Some of the hand carved horses were made by inmates of the United States Penitentiary in Leavenworth, Kansas. The amusement park's popularity peaked during the 1940s.

In the late 1950s, attendance declined while the commercial value of the land increased. The park closed on Labor Day, 1970. The pumping system from the swimming pools remains installed, and is used to pump drinking water to the residents of Hayden Island. The Jantzen Beach Carousel, also known as the C.W. Parker Four-Row Park Carousel, was installed inside the Jantzen Beach Mall, a shopping mall located on the grounds formerly occupied by the park, and it operated there from 1972 to 2012. However, it was removed in 2012 for the reconstruction of the shopping center, and it remains in storage . The carousel was added to the National Register of Historic Places in 1987 but was removed in 2008.

Attractions
 Big Dipper — wooden roller coaster (May 26, 1928 – 1969)
 Kiddie Dipper — steel roller coaster (1947–1970)
 Golden Canopy Ballroom
 The Jantzen Beach Carousel
 Natatorium
 Picnic grounds
 Two robot circus criers, "Laffing Sal" and "Joe Barker"
 Venetian Canal ride
 Jantzen Beach Railway
 Fun House
 Elbow Room Restaurant
 Midway
 Buzzer
 Roll-O-Planes
 Ferris Wheel
 Haunted house

See also
 Oaks Amusement Park
 Lotus Isle

References

 "The Coney Island of the West" — The Spectator, July, 1942 2006.
 "Jantzen Beach Amusement Park" — PDXHistory.com.
 "What All Portland Has Been Waiting For — Jantzen Beach"—Oregon Journal, May 24, 1928

External links 

 pdxHistory.com History of Jantzen Beach, collection of historic photos
 Center for Columbia River History

1928 establishments in Oregon
1970 disestablishments in Oregon
Amusement parks in Oregon
Defunct amusement parks in the United States
20th century in Portland, Oregon
Hayden Island, Portland, Oregon
North Portland, Oregon